CS Târgu Mureș was a football club based in Târgu Mureș, Mureș County in central Romania. It was founded in 1944 and it soon became one of the best teams from Mureș. The club was dissolved in 1960.

History

In 1944, the team of the railway workers, brought together the best players from Târgu Mureș, that previously played for MSE, MNKTE and MAV. The team participated in the local championship under the name of ASM Târgu Mureş.

In 1945 ASM became Dermagant and under this name the team promoted to Divizia A, in 1947, after a play-off match against Karres Mediaș. In 1947 the club changed its name to RATA, after the name of the factory, its main sponsor. In 1950 RATA became Locomotiva, and in 1955 it relegated to Divizia B. In 1955 the club changed his name again, this time to Avântul.

They promoted for the second time to Divizia A, but after only one season, the club returned to Divizia B. At this time the club becomes CS Târgu Mureş and at the end of the 1959–1960 season it relegated to the regional championship and, shortly after this, the club was dissolved.

The club played for 9 consecutive seasons in Divizia A and 10 in total, being the 2nd most successful team in the history of the city, after ASA Târgu Mureș. Its best position was 4th place at the end of the 1948–49 and 1952.

Chronology of names

Honours

Liga I:

Winners (0): Best finish: 4th (2): 1948–49, 1952

Liga II:

Winners (1): 1956

References

Association football clubs established in 1944
Association football clubs disestablished in 1960
Defunct football clubs in Romania
Football clubs in Mureș County
Liga I clubs
Liga II clubs
Târgu Mureș
1944 establishments in Romania
1960 disestablishments in Romania